Electronic skin refers to flexible, stretchable and self-healing electronics that are able to mimic functionalities of human or animal skin. The broad class of materials often contain sensing abilities that are intended to reproduce the capabilities of human skin to respond to environmental factors such as changes in heat and pressure.

Advances in electronic skin research focuses on designing materials that are stretchy, robust, and flexible. Research in the individual fields of flexible electronics and tactile sensing has progressed greatly; however, electronic skin design attempts to bring together advances in many areas of materials research without sacrificing individual benefits from each field. The successful combination of flexible and stretchable mechanical properties with sensors and the ability to self-heal would open the door to many possible applications including soft robotics, prosthetics, artificial intelligence and health monitoring.

Recent advances in the field of electronic skin have focused on incorporating green materials ideals and environmental awareness into the design process. As one of the main challenges facing electronic skin development is the ability of the material to withstand mechanical strain and maintain sensing ability or electronic properties, recyclability and self-healing properties are especially critical in the future design of new electronic skins.

Rehealable electronic skin
Self-healing abilities of electronic skin are critical to potential applications of electronic skin in fields such as soft robotics. Proper design of self-healing electronic skin requires not only healing of the base substrate but also the reestablishment of any sensing functions such as tactile sensing or electrical conductivity. Ideally, the self-healing process of electronic skin does not rely upon outside stimulation such as increased temperature, pressure, or solvation. Self-healing, or rehealable, electronic skin is often achieved through a polymer-based material or a hybrid material.

Polymer-based materials
In 2018, Zou et al. published work on electronic skin that is able to reform covalent bonds when damaged. The group looked at a polyimine-based crosslinked network, synthesized as seen in Figure 1. The e-skin is considered rehealable because of "reversible bond exchange," meaning that the bonds holding the network together are able to break and reform under certain conditions such as solvation and heating. The rehealable and reusable aspect of such a thermoset material is unique because many thermoset materials irreversibly form crosslinked networks through covalent bonds. In the polymer network the bonds formed during the healing process are indistinguishable from the original polymer network.  

Dynamic non-covalent crosslinking has also been shown to form a polymer network that is rehealable. In 2016, Oh et al. looked specifically at semiconducting polymers for organic transistors. They found that incorporating 2,6-pyridine dicarboxamide (PDCA) into the polymer backbone could impart self-healing abilities based on the network of hydrogen bonds formed between groups. With incorporation of PDCA in the polymer backbone, the materials was able to withstand up to 100% strain without showing signs of microscale cracking. In this example, the hydrogen bonds are available for energy dissipation as the strain increases.

Hybrid materials
Polymer networks are able to facilitate dynamic healing processes through hydrogen bonds or dynamic covalent chemistry. However, the incorporation of inorganic particles can greatly expand the functionality of polymer-based materials for electronic skin applications. The incorporation of micro-structured nickel particles into a polymer network (Figure 2) has been shown to maintain self-healing properties based on the reformation of hydrogen bonding networks around the inorganic particles. The material is able to regain its conductivity within 15 seconds of breakage, and the mechanical properties are regained after 10 minutes at room temperature without added stimulus. This material relies on hydrogen bonds formed between urea groups when they align. The hydrogen atoms of urea functional groups are ideally situated to form a hydrogen-bonding network because they are near an electron-withdrawing carbonyl group. This polymer network with embedded nickel particles demonstrates the possibility of using polymers as supramolecular hosts to develop self-healing conductive composites. 

Flexible and porous graphene foams that are interconnected in a 3D manner have also been shown to have self-healing properties. Thin film with poly(N,N-dimethylacrylamide)-poly(vinyl alcohol) (PDMAA) and reduced graphene oxide have shown high electrical conductivity and self-healing properties. The healing abilities of the hybrid composite are suspected to be due to the hydrogen bonds between the PDMAA chains, and the healing process is able to restore initial length and recover conductive properties.

Recyclable electronic skin 
Zou et al. presents an interesting advance in the field of electronic skin that can be used in robotics, prosthetics, and many other applications in the form of a fully recyclable electronic skin material. The e-skin developed by the group consists of a network of covalently bound polymers that are thermoset, meaning cured at a specific temperature. However, the material is also recyclable and reusable. Because the polymer network is thermoset, it is chemically and thermally stable. However, at room temperature, the polyimine material, with or without silver nanoparticles, can be dissolved on the timescale of a few hours. The recycling process allows devices, which are damaged beyond self-healing capabilities, to be dissolved and formed into new devices (Figure 3). This advance opens the door for lower cost production and greener approaches to e-skin development.

Flexible and stretchy electronic skin 
The ability of electronic skin to withstand mechanical deformation including stretching and flexing without losing functionality is crucial for its applications as prosthetics, artificial intelligence, soft robotics, health monitoring, biocompatibility, and communication devices. Flexible electronics are often designed by depositing electronic materials on flexible polymer substrates, thereby relying on an organic substrate to impart favorable mechanical properties. Stretchable e-skin materials have been approached from two directions. Hybrid materials can rely on an organic network for stretchiness while embedding inorganic particles or sensors, which are not inherently stretchable. Other research has focused on developing stretchable materials that also have favorable electronic or sensing capabilities.

Zou et al. studied the inclusion of linkers that are described as "serpentine" in their polyimine matrix. These linkers make the e-skin sensors able to flex with movement and distortion. The incorporation of alkyl spacers in polymer-based materials has also been shown to increase flexibility without decreasing charge transfer mobility. Oh et al. developed a stretchable and flexible material based on 3,6-di(thiophen-2-yl)-2,5-dihydropyrrolo[3,4-c]pyrrole-1,4-dione (DPP) and non-conjugated 2,6-pyridine dicarboxamide (PDCA) as a source of hydrogen bonds (Figure 4). 

Graphene has also been show to be a suitable material for electronic skin applications as well due to its stiffness and tensile strength. Graphene is an appealing material because its synthesis to flexible substrates is scalable and cost-efficient.

Conductive electronic skin 
The development of conductive electronic skin is of interest for many electrical applications. Research into conductive electronic skin has taken two routes: conductive self-healing polymers or embedding conductive inorganic materials in non-conductive polymer networks.

The self-healing conductive composite synthesized by Tee et al. (Figure 2) investigated the incorporation of micro-structured nickel particles into a polymer host. The nickel particles adhere to the network though favorable interactions between the native oxide layer on the surface of the particles and the hydrogen-bonding polymer.

Nanoparticles have also been studied for their ability to impart conductivity on electronic skin materials. Zou et al. embedded silver nanoparticles (AgNPs) into a polymer matrix, making the e-skin conductive. The healing process for this material is noteworthy because it not only restores the mechanical properties of the polymer network, but also restores the conductive properties when silver nanoparticles have been embedded in the polymer network.

Sensing ability of electronic skin 
Some of the challenges that face electronic skin sensing abilities include the fragility of sensors, the recovery time of sensors, repeatability, overcoming mechanical strain, and long-term stability.

Tactile sensors
Applied pressure can be measured by monitoring changes in resistance or capacitance. Coplanar interdigitated electrodes embedded on single-layer graphene have been shown to provide pressure sensitivity for applied pressure as low as 0.11 kPa through measuring changes in capacitance. Piezoresistive sensors have also shown high levels of sensitivity.

Ultrathin molybdenum disulfide sensing arrays integrated with graphene have demonstrated promising mechanical properties capable of pressure sensing. Modifications of organic field effect transistors (OFETs) have shown promise in electronic skin applications. Microstructured polydimethylsiloxane thin films can elastically deform when pressure is applied. The deformation of the thin film allows for storage and release of energy.

Visual representation of applied pressure has been one area of interest in development of tactile sensors. The Bao Group at Stanford University have designed an electrochromically active electronic skin that changes color with different amounts of applied pressure. Applied pressure can also be visualized by incorporation of active-matrix organic light-emitting diode displays which emit light when pressure is applied.

Prototype e-skins include a printed synaptic transistor–based electronic skin giving skin-like haptic sensations and touch/pain-sensitivity to a robotic hand, and a multilayer tactile sensor repairable hydrogel-based robot skin.

Other sensing applications
Humidity sensors have been incorporated in electronic skin design with sulfurized tungsten films. The conductivity of the film changes with different levels of humidity. Silicon nanoribbons have also been studied for their application as temperature, pressure, and humidity sensors. Scientists at the University of Glasgow have made inroads in developing an e-skin that feels pain real-time, with applications in prosthetics and more life-like humanoids.

A system of an electronic skin and a human-machine interface that can enable remote sensed tactile perception, and wearable or robotic sensing of many hazardous substances and pathogens.

See also
Artificial cell
Artificial muscle
Electronic nose
Electronic tongue
Robotic sensing
Sensitive skin
Soft robotics

References

Emerging technologies
Robotic sensing
Smart materials
Synthetic biology
Skin